Pinalia moluccana, synonym Eria kingii, commonly known as the common gremlin orchid, is a plant in the orchid family and is an epiphyte or lithophyte with crowded pseudobulbs, each with three or four thin, channelled leaves. Up to fifty white or cream-coloured, cup-shaped flowers with hairy exteriors are arranged along an erect flowering stem. It is native to areas between Sulawesi and  tropical North Queensland.

Description
The flowers are hairy on the outside. The side lobes are erect and the middle lobe turns downwards and has a ridge along its midline. Flowering occurs between August and October in Australia.

Taxonomy and naming
Eria kingii was first formally described in 1877 by Ferdinand von Mueller who published the description in Southern Science Record. Mueller "gladly dedicated it to Mr. King" who supplied the type specimen from his conservatory. "Mr. King" is further identified earlier in the same article as "Arthur (Septimus) King, Esq., son of ... Admiral Ph. Parker King"  Eria moluccana was first formally described in 1905 by Rudolf Schlechter and Johannes Jacobus Smith. , Plants of the World Online and the World Checklist of Selected Plant Families regarded both names as synonyms of Pinalia moluccana, although the epithet kingii is the older.

Distribution and habitat
The common gremlin orchid grows in rocks and trees in humid situations, often on branches overhanging water. It is found in Sulawesi, the Maluku Islands, New Guinea, the Solomon Islands and Queensland, Australia. In Queensland it is found from the Iron Range to the Tully River.

References 

moluccana
Plants described in 1882
Orchids of Papua New Guinea
Orchids of Indonesia
Orchids of Queensland
Taxa named by Ferdinand von Mueller